Tholymis tillarga, the coral-tailed cloudwing, is a species of dragonfly in the family Libellulidae. It is found from tropical West Africa to Asia, Australia and the Pacific Islands. Common names include old world twister, evening skimmer, crepuscular darter, foggy-winged twister and twister.

Description and habitat
It is a medium sized dragonfly with reddish eyes, yellowish red thorax and coral red abdomen. Its wings are transparent; but hind wings have a golden-brown patch in the base, bordered by a cloudy-white patch. Female is brown and lacks the cloudy-white patch in the hind-wings.

It is a migrant with a permanent presence in humid parts of the tropics. It breeds in standing water-bodies; and prefers weedy ponds, swamps and lakes. They are active at dusk and dawn, as well as during cloudy days.

Gallery

See also
 List of odonates of Sri Lanka
 List of odonates of India
 List of odonata of Kerala
 List of Odonata species of Australia

References

External links

Libellulidae
Odonata of Africa
Odonata of Asia
Odonata of Australia
Insects of India
Insects of New Guinea
Taxa named by Johan Christian Fabricius
Insects described in 1798